Ford Fusion may refer to:
 Ford Fusion (Americas), mid-size car produced between 2006 and 2020 model year
 Ford Fusion Hybrid, gasoline-electric hybrid powered version 
 Ford Fusion Energi, plug-in hybrid version
 Ford Fusion (Europe), mini MPV produced from 2002 to 2012 sold in Europe

Set index articles on cars